Brody Tyler Koerner (born October 17, 1993) is an American professional baseball pitcher who is currently a free agent. He made his Major League Baseball (MLB) debut in 2021 with the New York Yankees.

Career
Koerner spent three seasons with Clemson Tigers. While there he was a three-time ACC Academic Roll member and had 100 strikeouts in 97.2 innings pitched over 31 appearances (19 starts) in his Clemson career (2013-15). In 2015 he pitched the best game of his college career, a four-hit shutout with seven strikeouts at No. 8 South Carolina on March 2. Later that year he was drafted by the New York Yankees in the 17th round of the 2015 Major League Baseball draft.

New York Yankees
In six minor league seasons at every level of the Yankee organization, Koerner is 24-20 with eight saves, a 3.79 ERA and 322 strikeouts in 434.0 innings pitched over 108 appearances (65 starts). He joined Gigantes del Cibao of the Dominican winter League during their 2019-20 season, leading all the teams starting pitchers with a 2.17 ERA over seven starts. 

Koerner was called up by the Yankees on August 3, 2021, and made his major league debut the same night. He pitched the final two innings, allowing two hits and one run in the Yankees' 13-1 victory. Luis Gil started the game and Stephen Ridings also pitched.  It was only the second time that three pitchers debuted in the same game for the Yankees, previously occurring on September 26, 1950. Koerner appeared in 2 games for the Yankees, posting an ERA of 3.00 with 1 strikeout. On August 21, Koerner was optioned to Triple-A Scraton. On August 26, Koerner was outrighted off the 40-man roster.  On October 3, Koerner was re-selected to the 40-man roster, but was designated for assignment two days later prior to the team's Wild Card game appearance. On October 13, Koerner elected free agency.

Tecolotes de los Dos Laredos
On April 20, 2022, Koerner signed with the Tecolotes de los Dos Laredos of the Mexican League. He made one start, pitching 5 innings and giving up 2 earned runs.

Chicago White Sox
On May 3, 2022, Koerner signed a minor league deal with the Chicago White Sox. He was released on June 3, 2022.

References

External links

1993 births
Living people
People from Winchester, Virginia
Baseball players from Virginia
Major League Baseball pitchers
New York Yankees players
Clemson Tigers baseball players
Pulaski Yankees players
Charleston RiverDogs players
Tampa Yankees players
Scottsdale Scorpions players
Trenton Thunder players
Scranton/Wilkes-Barre RailRiders players
Gigantes del Cibao players
Tecolotes de los Dos Laredos players
American expatriate baseball players in the Dominican Republic
American expatriate baseball players in Mexico
Tigres del Licey players
Charlotte Knights players